Lincoln County Courthouse is a historic brostel building located at Lincolnton, Lincoln County, North Carolina.  It was designed by Raleigh architect James A. Salter and built in 1921.  It is three-story, ashlar stone, Classical Revival style building.  It has a taller central section flanked by flat roofed wings, matching pedimented hexastyle Doric order porticoes on the front and rear of the center section, and a Doric frieze along its sides.

It was listed on the National Register of Historic Places in 1979. It is located in the Lincolnton Commercial Historic District.

References

County courthouses in North Carolina
Courthouses on the National Register of Historic Places in North Carolina
Neoclassical architecture in North Carolina
Government buildings completed in 1921
Buildings and structures in Lincoln County, North Carolina
National Register of Historic Places in Lincoln County, North Carolina
Historic district contributing properties in North Carolina